The New York Rovers were a senior ice hockey team that was established in 1935. They played in the Eastern Hockey League as a farm team of the New York Rangers. The Rovers played alongside the Rangers in Madison Square Garden. They played in the Eastern League through 1947–48. When the EHL took a break for the 1948–49 season, the Rovers played in the Quebec Senior Hockey League until the EHL resumed for the 1949–50 season. The Rovers folded in 1952 because of a dispute over television rights. The team couldn't sell the rights and could not afford to go on without doing so.

The team was briefly resurrected in 1959, playing in the Long Island Arena. The Rovers changed their name to the Long Island Ducks in 1961.

One last hurrah for the Rovers was 1964–65 when they played for one season in the Madison Square Garden. It was not a financial success.

Awards
 1936–37: Won Hershey Cup (consolation final).
 1938–39: Won Hamilton B. Wills Trophy. Won the United States National Senior Hockey Championships.
 1940–41: Won Hamilton B. Wills Trophy.
 1941–42: Won Boardwalk Cup (regular season). Won the United States National Senior Hockey Championships.

Rovers who played in the NHL

References

Senior ice hockey teams
Ice hockey clubs established in 1935
Ice hockey teams in New York (state)
Defunct ice hockey teams in the United States
New York Rangers minor league affiliates
1935 establishments in New York (state)